Good Girls Don't is an American sitcom created by Claudia Lonow and produced by Carsey-Werner-Mandabach which stars Bree Turner and Joy Gohring. Eight episodes of the series were aired on Oxygen in 2004.

Cast
Bree Turner as Marjorie 
Joy Gohring as Jane
Kevin Christy as Ben
Brent King as Davis
Nichole Hiltz as Lizzie

References

External links
 Official Website
 Carsey-Werner - Good Girls Don't
 

2000s American sitcoms
2004 American television series debuts
2004 American television series endings
Oxygen (TV channel) original programming
English-language television shows